Victor Stăncescu (born March 10, 1985) is a Romanian born Swiss professional ice hockey forward who is currently playing with and Captaining the Kloten Flyers in Switzerland's National League A (NLA).

He participated at the 2011 IIHF World Championship as a member of the Switzerland men's national ice hockey team.

Career statistics

Regular season and playoffs

International

References

External links

1985 births
Living people
GCK Lions players
EHC Kloten players
Swiss ice hockey forwards
Swiss people of Romanian descent
Romanian expatriate sportspeople in Switzerland